Dmitry Matveyev (born 25 December 1984) is a Russian skier. He competed in the Nordic combined event at the 2006 Winter Olympics.

References

1984 births
Living people
Russian male Nordic combined skiers
Olympic Nordic combined skiers of Russia
Nordic combined skiers at the 2006 Winter Olympics
Sportspeople from Saint Petersburg